Joseph Baker McCutcheon (June 10, 1929 – July 27, 2004) was an American gridiron football player and coach.  He served as the head football coach at Randolph–Macon College in Ashland, Virginia from 1958 to 1963, compiling a recorder of 22–27–3. McCutcheon was a star football player at Washington & Lee University in Lexington, Virginia. He was selected by the Pittsburgh Steelers in the 1951 NFL Draft.

Head coaching record

References

1929 births
2004 deaths
American football centers
American football linebackers
American players of Canadian football
Montreal Alouettes players
Randolph–Macon Yellow Jackets football coaches
Washington and Lee Generals football players
People from Webster Springs, West Virginia
Coaches of American football from West Virginia
Players of American football from West Virginia